Rangeela may refer to:

Saeed Khan Rangeela (1937–2005), Pakistani film actor
Rangeela (1995 film), a 1995 Indian  romantic comedy drama film 
Rangeela (upcoming film), an upcoming Indian Malayalam-language film
Rangeela (album), a 2013 album by Shireen Jawad
Rangeelay, a 2013 Indian film